Gianni Forte is an Italian artist, born in Rome (Italy). He works in visual media, mainly photography and he is a member of the Royal Photographic Society (ARPS).

Biography 

Gianni Forte educational background includes a first class BA(Hons) in Photography and Digital Imaging and a MA in Photography obtained in London, United Kingdom, Thames Valley University (now University of West London).
Gianni Forte's work is exhibited around the world. 
In the past few years his work has been awarded in several international competitions and his perspectives on the subject has been featured in many publications including the Sunday Times magazine, The AOP Image magazine, the Royal Photographic Society Journal, New Shoot, the British Journal of Photography, Vogue and other international reviews.
Gianni Forte has also been selected as an YPU member and is on the prestigious Talentpool on the D&AD. His work has also been included in the book ʻPortfolio IIʼ, published by the Royal Photographic Society.

Exhibitions and Achievements 
THE POLLUX AWARDS 3rd Edition 2011
RPS INTERNATIONAL PROJECTED IMAGE EXHIBITION & Itinerary Tour, 2011.  RPS
PHOTO-SOUP MEXICO 2011, Mexico City
THE WORLDWIDE PHOTOGRAPHY GALA AWARDS-Best Shot & Portrait & People Competitions 2011.
THE POLLUX AWARDS -APRIL 2011.
THE PHOTO ANNUAL AWARDS 2011.
THE POLLUX AWARDS 2010.
PX3 INTERNATIONAL GRAND PRIX DE LA PHOTOGRAPHIE Paris, 2010.
PORTFOLIO II, Royal Photographic Society, 2010.
PHOTO-SOUP BARCELONA 2010
PHOTOFAIR/PHOTOMONTH LONDON 2010.
CRAF International Photographic Competition & Exhibition, Italy 2009.
THE BUNKER, London, 2009.
151st RPS INTERNATIONAL PRINT EXHIBITION & Itinerary Tour Exhibition, 2008.  RPS
ECOVISUAL-ENVIRONMENTAL, International Photographic Competition (LPA) - 2007.
LET’S FACE IT 3, International Photographic Competition and Exhibition, Portraiture. London (LPA) - 2007.
PASSION, International Photographic Competition and Exhibition, Fashion. London (LPA) - 2007.
THE SPITZ GALLERY, London, 2007.
AOP (Association of Photographers) 2007.

External links
Official Site
Gianni Forte at the Royal Photographic Society
Gianni Forte at Saatchi
Photo-Soup.org: Gianni Forte.

1972 births
Photographers from Rome
Living people